Adam Masina (born 2 January 1994) is a Moroccan professional footballer who plays as a left-back for Italian  club Udinese and the Morocco national team.

Coming through Bologna's youth academy, Masina made his senior appearance with the club in 2012, and transferred to Watford in 2018. He was also loaned to Giacomense twice.

Masina was born in Morocco, and moved to Italy at a young age. He initially represented Italy internationally at under-21 level, before opting to play for the Morocco national team since 2021.

Club career 
Masina was born in Khouribga, Morocco, but lost his mother as just an infant. He successively moved to Italy together with his brother and father, settling down in Emilia-Romagna, and was later assigned to a number of foster families due to his father's problems with alcoholism. He was eventually adopted by one of them, from which he took his last name.

At the age of 11, he was scouted and signed by Bologna. After a successful loan in Giacomense, he returned to Bologna in 2013 and made his senior debut for the Rossoblu in a 2–1 away win over Latina on 12 October 2014. He helped the club obtain Serie A promotion, later making his debut in the top division, and scoring his first goal in Serie A in an injury time victory at Carpi.

On 2 July 2018, Masina signed for English side Watford on a five-year contract for an undisclosed fee.

On 18 July 2022, Masina signed a three-year contract with Italian club Udinese.

International career 
In November 2015 Luigi Di Biagio called Masina to represent Italy U21 team after obtaining FIFA transfer. He made his debut with the Italy U21 side on 17 November 2015, in a Euro 2017 qualification match against Lithuania.

In March 2021, Masina was called up to represent Morocco in African Cup of Nations qualifier matches against Mauritania and Burundi. He made his debut on 26 March 2021 against Mauritania.

Style of play 
Masina is known in particular for his technique, physicality and energy as a left-back.

Career statistics

Honours 
Watford
FA Cup runner-up: 2018–19

Individual
Serie B Footballer of the Year: 2015
PFA Team of the Year: 2021

References

External links 
 
 

Living people
1994 births
People from Khouribga
Moroccan footballers
Italian footballers
Association football fullbacks
Italy under-21 international footballers
Morocco international footballers
Italian sportspeople of African descent
Moroccan emigrants to Italy
Serie A players
Serie B players
Premier League players
English Football League players
A.C. Giacomense players
Bologna F.C. 1909 players
Watford F.C. players
Udinese Calcio players
Moroccan expatriate footballers
Italian expatriate footballers
Expatriate footballers in England
Moroccan expatriate sportspeople in England
Italian expatriate sportspeople in England
2021 Africa Cup of Nations players
Adoptees